Elections to Lewisham London Borough Council were held on 4 May 2006.  The whole council was up for election for the first time since the 2002 election.

Lewisham local elections are held every four years, with the next due in 2010.

Election result

|}

The Green Party won all three seats in the Brockley and Ladywell wards and the Socialist Alternative won two seats in the Telegraph Hill ward.

Election for Mayor

¹Under the Supplementary Vote system, if no candidate receives 50% of 1st choice votes, 2nd choice votes are added to the result for the top two 1st choice candidates. If a ballot gives a first and second preference to the top two candidates in either order, then their second preference is not counted, so that a second preference cannot count against a first.

²Percentage figures are not officially used on the final votes, they are produced here for illustration and are calculated by the candidates final vote divided by the total of final votes.

Ward results

Bellingham

Blackheath

Brockley

Catford South

Crofton Park

Downham

Evelyn

Forest Hill

Grove Park

Ladywell

Lee Green

Lewisham Central

New Cross

Perry Vale

Rushey Green

Sydenham

Telegraph Hill

Whitefoot

References

2006
2006 London Borough council elections